William Dominic Austin (born March 8, 1975 in Washington, D.C.) is a former professional American football cornerback in the National Football League.

He graduated from Kempner High School in Sugar Land, Texas where he was a standout scholar and athlete.  He got a full scholarship to play Division I football at the University of New Mexico.  He attended UNM from 1993–1997 and was an ALL Conference defensive back his sophomore, junior, and senior year.  He is on the Lobo all-time great football players. He played for the Indianapolis Colts from 1998, 1999, 2000 and was a part of the AFC East Championship team in 1999.

He currently resides in Houston, Texas.

After football

After being diagnosed with stage 4 Cancer, Austin launched the Tackles 4 Cancer Nonprofit. His mission to assist other Cancer patients with transportation to and from their life saving treatments served as the fundamental mission of the organization. Now Cancer free for 8 years, he has hosted over 20 events with celebrities and was featured as an inspirational figure by Beyonce's BeGood Foundation.

References

External links
nfl.com player page
Billy Austin's stats

Tackles4Cancer Website 
Beyonce Be Good Feature 
Tackles 4 Cancer on Houston Life

1975 births
Living people
Players of American football from Washington, D.C.
American football cornerbacks
New Mexico Lobos football players
Indianapolis Colts players
People from Sugar Land, Texas
Kempner High School alumni